Frank MacQuarrie (January 27, 1875 in San Francisco – December 25, 1950 in Los Angeles) was an American silent film actor.

He was the brother of actors Albert MacQuarrie, George MacQuarrie and Murdock MacQuarrie.

Filmography

 The Black Box (1915) .... Craig
 Jane's Declaration of Independence (1915)
 His Beloved Violin (1915)
 Haunting Winds (1915)
 The Mystery of the Tapestry Room (1915)
 Every Man's Money (1915)
 The Kiss of Dishonor (1915)
 Graft (1915)
 Just Plain Folks (1916)
 The Pool of Flame (1916) .... Des Trebes
 The Desperado (1916)
 Two Men of Sandy Bar (1916) .... Old Morton
 The Crimson Yoke (1916) .... Luridi
 The Social Slave (1916)
 Priscilla's Prisoner (1916)
 The Secret of the Swamp (1916) .... Deacon Todd
 From Broadway to a Throne (1916) .... Heldone
 A Daughter of the Night (1916)
 The Decoy (1916)
 Society's Hypocrites (1916)
 The Voice on the Wire (1917)
The Boss of the Lazy Y  (1917) .... Tom Taggart
 A 44-Calibre Mystery (1917)
 The Almost Good Man (1917)
 The Field of Honor (1917) .... Amos Tolliver
 A Five Foot Ruler (1917)
 The Charmer (1917) (credited as Frank McQuarrie) .... Judge Applebee
 A Stormy Knight (1917) (credited as Frank McQuarrie) .... Mr. Weller
 Flirting with Death (1917)
 The Man Trap (1917) .... Finch
 The Maternal Spark (1917) .... Lansing Hawley
 The High Sign (1917) (credited as Frank McQuarrie) .... Metwer
 The Flash of Fate (1918)
 Little Red Decides (1918)
 Wolves of the Border (1918) .... Joe Warner
 Madame Sphinx (1918) .... Henri Du Bois
 The Girl of My Dreams (1918) .... Pa Williams
 Whitewashed Walls (1919) .... Cascaro
 Loot (1919) .... Jacques
 Under Suspicion (1919) .... Greggs
 The Lone Hand (1919)

External links

 

1875 births
1950 deaths
American male film actors
Male actors from California
American male silent film actors
20th-century American male actors